Madonna and Child with Four Saints is an oil on canvas painting by Moretto da Brescia, executed c. 1543, now in the Pinacoteca di Brera in Milan, to which it moved during the Napoleonic seizures in 1808. It was painted for the church of Santa Maria degli Angeli in Gardone Val Trompia. In the foreground are the saints Jerome, Francis of Assisi and Anthony the Great.

References

Paintings of Francis of Assisi
Paintings of Jerome
Paintings of Anthony the Great
1543 paintings
Paintings of the Madonna and Child by Moretto da Brescia
Paintings in the collection of the Pinacoteca di Brera
Angels in art